Saratovsky (Harıtaw) is a rural locality (a khutor) in Dmitriyevsky Selsoviet, Zilairsky District, Bashkortostan, Russia. The population was 65 as of 2010. There are 2 streets.

Geography 
Saratovsky is located 27 km northwest of Zilair (the district's administrative centre) by road. Dmitriyevka is the nearest rural locality.

References 

Rural localities in Zilairsky District